Agaricus arorae is a moderate-sized, forest-dwelling mushroom that exhibits distinctive color changes. It fruits early in the mushroom season. Unusually within the genus Agaricus, the mushroom's cap cuticle turns yellow when exposed to a base such as potassium hydroxide or sodium hydroxide but stains red when cut. In the field, it has a brownish, fibrillose/squamulose cap, which turns red when bruised. Agaricus arorae was first described from Santa Cruz County but since has been found in San Mateo and Alameda counties. Agaricus arorae can be distinguished by its scales and a conspicuous stipe.

Agaricus arorae was named after American mycologist and author David Arora.

Description

Pileus
The cap is 3–8 cm broad, and varies from hemispheric to convex. The margin starts curved, but then decurved. The cuticle slowly bruises a reddish colour, and yellows with KOH. With a dry surface, the cap's disc can be glabrous or tomentose. Toward the margin, either minute fibers or scales develop. The cap's fibrils are generally a brownish colour. The cap has an indistinct odor with a mild taste. The context can be as large as 5 mm thick, soft, and bruises irregularly a vinaceous colour where cut.

Lamellae
The gills are free, close, and broad. At first, they are buff-brown, but turn a darker brown in age.

Stipe
The stipe is 4–9 cm long and 0.5-2.5 cm thick. At the base, it is slightly enlarged and becomes stuffed at maturity. The white veil is rather membranous and yields a thin ring. When cut, the cortex discolours to pinkish-orange. The stipe base changes brown to rusty-brown from handling. The margin is sometimes light brown. The apex surface is white, and patchy fibrillose over a dull-buff ground color.

Spores
Spores are 4.5-5.0 x 3.0-3.5 µm, elliptical, and inequilateral in profile. In addition, they are moderately thick-walled, lacking a germ pore.

See also
 List of Agaricus species

References

Specific

arorae
Fungi described in 1985